Ronald Charles Porta (3 June 1936 – 19 March 2010) was an Australian rules footballer who played with Footscray and South Melbourne in the Victorian Football League (VFL).

He coached Victorian Football Association club Mordialloc from 1962 to 1964.

Notes

External links 
		
		

1936 births
2010 deaths
Australian rules footballers from Victoria (Australia)
Western Bulldogs players
Sydney Swans players
Mordialloc Football Club players
Mordialloc Football Club coaches